Ebbers is a neighbourhood in northeast Edmonton, Alberta, Canada that was established in 2006 through the adoption of the Ebbers Neighbourhood Area Structure Plan (NASP).  

It is located within Casselman-Steele Heights and was originally considered Neighbourhood 6 within the Casselman-Steele Heights Outline Plan (OP).

Ebbers is bounded on the west by Manning Drive, north by the future extension of 153 Avenue, east by a Canadian National rail line, and south by 144 Avenue.

Surrounding neighbourhoods

References 

Neighbourhoods in Edmonton